Teresa del Pò  (1649–1716), also spelled del Po, was an Italian painter and engraver of the late Baroque.

Life
She was born in Rome in 1649, the daughter of Pietro del Pò. She was his second daughter of this name. An earlier Teresa, baptised in Naples in 1646, must have died in infancy.

She is said to have painted in oil and in miniature, and etched a few plates in the style of her father; they included Susannah and the Elders,
after Carracci. She became a member of the Accademia di San Luca in Rome, and died in Naples in 1716.

References

Sources
 

1649 births
1716 deaths
18th-century Italian painters
18th-century Italian women artists
Italian engravers
Italian women painters
Painters from Rome
Women engravers
17th-century engravers
17th-century Italian women artists
Catholic painters
Catholic engravers
Female Catholic artists